Brian Etheridge may refer to:

 Brian Etheridge, character in comic book series V for Vendetta
 Brian Etheridge (footballer) (born 1944), retired English footballer